On November 4, 2014, Washington, D.C., held an election for its mayor, concurrently with U.S. Senate elections in various states and U.S. House elections and various state and local elections.

Incumbent Democratic Mayor Vincent C. Gray ran for re-election to a second term but was defeated in the April 1 primary by Ward 4 District Councilwoman Muriel Bowser. Bowser went on to win the general election against independent candidates David Catania and Carol Schwartz.

Democratic primary

Candidates

Declared
 Carlos Allen, musician and promoter
 Muriel Bowser, Ward 4 District Councilwoman
 Jack Evans, Ward 2 District Councilman
 Vincent C. Gray, incumbent Mayor
 Reta Jo Lewis, former State Department official
 Michael J. Green, candidate for Ward 4 District Councilmember in 2007 and write-in candidate for Mayor in 2010
 Vincent Orange, At-Large District Councilman
 Andy Shallal, artist, activist, and proprietor of Busboys and Poets
 Tommy Wells, Ward 6 District Councilman

Withdrew
 Christian A. Carter, businessman (withdrew January 18, 2014)

Declined
 Robert Bobb, former city administrator
 Adrian Fenty, former Mayor
 Eric W. Price, former Deputy Mayor
 Anthony A. Williams, former Mayor

Endorsements

Polling

 ^ Internal poll for the Muriel Bowser campaign
 * Internal poll for the Tommy Wells campaign

Results

Republican primary
The District of Columbia Republican Party said it may appoint a candidate to run in the general election. However, since it did not do so by September 8, 2014, no Republican candidate appeared on the general election ballot.

Candidates

Withdrew
 Kris Hammond, attorney and former Advisory Neighborhood Commissioner

Declined
 Michael Powell, former Chairman of the Federal Communications Commission
 Carol Schwartz, former At-large District Councilwoman and four-time mayoral candidate (ran as an Independent)

Results

Libertarian primary

Candidates

Declared
 Bruce Majors, real estate agent and nominee for U.S. Delegate in 2012

Results

D.C. Statehood Green primary

Candidates

Declared
 Faith Dane, perennial candidate

Results

Independent

Candidates

Declared
 David Catania, independent at-large D.C. Councillor
 Carol Schwartz, former Republican At-large D.C. Councillor and candidate for mayor in 1986, 1994, 1998 and 2002

Withdrew
 Nestor Djonkam, engineer and Democratic candidate for mayor in 2006
 Ben Foshager (write-in)

Disqualified
 James M. Caviness
 Michael T. Green
 David O. Leacraft-EL
 Frank E. Sewell

Declined
 John Hill, CFO of Detroit, former CEO of the Federal City Council and former Executive Director of the District of Columbia Financial Control Board
 Marie Johns, Deputy Administrator of the Small Business Administration and candidate for Mayor in 2006
 Cathy L. Lanier, Chief of Police for the Metropolitan Police Department of the District of Columbia
 Kathleen Patterson, former Ward 3 District Councilwoman

General election

Polling

 * Internal poll for the Karl Racine campaign for Attorney General

Results

Notes

References

Mayoral
2014
Washington
Washington